The 8 cm Feldkanone M.5 was a field gun used by Austria-Hungary during World War I.  It was a conventional design, with its most notable feature being its obsolescent autofrettaged bronze (so-called steel-bronze, see Franz von Uchatius) barrel, necessary because Austria-Hungary still had trouble making steel of the proper quality.

History 
Austrians took years to decide on the proper recoil system of their new light field gun amid the so-called "quick-firing revolution", and the type of its breech. At the turn of the 20th century Austro-Hungarian light field artillery was armed with a slightly upgraded design from mid-1870s, the 9 cm Feldkanone M 75/96 (classified as "accelerated fire" at the time due to a spring-mounted spade brake reducing but not eliminating recoil of the carriage). German military was concerned that their closest ally may be outgunned, and after consulting with both Krupp and Ehrhardt Austrians bought the rights for the QF gun of the latter company. Even then production difficulties prevented its introduction into service until 1907.

Users 
In addition to being used by Austria-Hungary during World War I the M.5/8 was widely used by its successor states after the war.  Guns captured by Italy were used in both World War I and World War II as the Cannone da 77/28 modello 5/8 and the  Cannone da 77/28 CA (from contraereo meaning anti-aircraft).  Weapons captured by Nazi Germany were used under the designations 7.65 cm FK 5/8(ö), 7.65 cm FK 5/8(t), 7.65 cm FK 5/8(j) or 7.65 cm FK 300(j), 7.65 cm FK(i) and 7.65 cm Flak 268/1(i) depending on which country they were taken from eg Östereich = Austria,  tschechisch from Czech

Variants 
The M.5 was adapted for use in narrow mountain paths as the M.5/8 and could be disassembled into three loads.  The base of the barrel was given lifting grips to speed its removal from the carriage and the carriage itself was modified to allow it to be disassembled.
Later M.5/8 barrels were made out of steel and full length axles of cast steel were available for use in its field gun configuration as found on an example rescued from a Dutch barn. This gun was also fitted with German army standard wooden wheels that differ from Austrian military standard through the lack of metal lugs on the spoke ends.

In addition to its field gun and mountain gun roles the M.5/8 was also adapted to an anti-aircraft role by placing the gun on a high-angle pedestal mount with 360 ° traverse and firing shrapnell shell. In this form it was named "8 cm Luftfahrzeugabwehr-Kanone M 5/8 Mittelpivotlafette." The Italians also had an anti-aircraft version of the M 05/08 called the Cannone da 77/28 CA (contraereo).  Despite its obsolescence it was deployed by Italian home guard units during World War II for static anti-aircraft defense and those captured by Germany after the Italian armistice in 1943 were given the designation 7.65 cm Flak 268/1(i).  There were also anti-aircraft versions of the M.5/8 in use with Czechoslovakia and Yugoslavia.

Gallery

Notes

References
 Englemann, Joachim and Scheibert, Horst. Deutsche Artillerie 1934-1945: Eine Dokumentation in Text, Skizzen und Bildern: Ausrüstung, Gliderung, Ausbildung, Führung, Einsatz. Limburg/Lahn, Germany: C. A. Starke, 1974
 Gander, Terry and Chamberlain, Peter. Weapons of the Third Reich: An Encyclopedic Survey of All Small Arms, Artillery and Special Weapons of the German Land Forces 1939-1945. New York: Doubleday, 1979 
 Ortner, M. Christian. The Austro-Hungarian Artillery From 1867 to 1918: Technology, Organization, and Tactics. Vienna, Verlag Militaria, 2007 
 Chamberlain, Peter and Gander, Terry. Light and Medium Field Artillery. New York, Arco
 Chamberlain, Peter and Gander, Terry. Anti-Aircraft Guns. New York, Arco

External links

 M 05 on Landships

 

World War I guns
World War I artillery of Austria-Hungary
Anti-aircraft guns of Italy
76 mm artillery